Nefundella xalapensis is a species of snout moth in the genus Nefundella. It is found in Mexico.

References

Moths described in 1986
Phycitini